The 2019–20 Arkansas State Red Wolves men's basketball team represented Arkansas State University during the 2019–20 NCAA Division I men's basketball season. The Red Wolves, led by third-year head coach Mike Balado, played their home games at the First National Bank Arena in Jonesboro, Arkansas as members of the Sun Belt Conference. They finished the season 16–16, 8–12 in Sun Belt play to finish in a three-way tie for eighth place. As the No. 9 seed in the Sun Belt tournament, they lost in the first round to Louisiana.

Previous season
The Red Wolves finished the 2018–19 season 13–19, 7–11 in Sun Belt play to finish in 9th place. They lost in the first round of the Sun Belt tournament to South Alabama.

Roster

Schedule and results

|-
!colspan=9 style=| Exhibition

|-
!colspan=9 style=| Regular season

|-
!colspan=9 style=| Sun Belt tournament

References

Arkansas State Red Wolves men's basketball seasons
Arkansas State
Arkansas State Red Wolves men's basketball
Arkansas State Red Wolves men's basketball